Zanomys is a genus of North American tangled nest spiders first described by R. V. Chamberlin in 1948.

Species
 it contains eight species:
Zanomys aquilonia Leech, 1972 – USA, Canada
Zanomys californica (Banks, 1904) – USA
Zanomys feminina Leech, 1972 – USA
Zanomys hesperia Leech, 1972 – USA
Zanomys kaiba Chamberlin, 1948 – USA
Zanomys ochra Leech, 1972 – USA
Zanomys sagittaria Leech, 1972 – USA
Zanomys ultima Leech, 1972 – USA

References

Amaurobiidae
Araneomorphae genera
Spiders of North America